Isqiraqucha (Quechua isqira mud, qucha lake, "mud lake", Hispanicized spelling Esgueracocha) is a mountain in the Andes of Peru near a small lake of that name. The mountain and the lake are located in the Lima Region, Oyón Province, Oyón District.

References

Mountains of Peru
Mountains of Lima Region
Lakes of Peru
Lakes of Lima Region